Johann Gottfried Spiesshofer (February 9, 1854 – March 31, 1917) was a German industrialist and pioneer of the undergarment industry. The son of a weaver, he was known for his outstanding expertise in weaving techniques. Together with merchant Michael Braun he established the corsetry manufacturer "Spiesshofer & Braun" in Heubach (Württemberg) in 1886. From 1902 onwards the company traded under the name "Triumph" as this was considered a more memorable brand name. Having started off with six sewing machines and six employees in a barn, the company had annual sales of 1.7 billion Euros in 2009, and 37,515 employees. Still family owned, by now the multinational manufacturing and marketing organization operates in 120 countries around the globe. It is one of the leading underwear companies in the world and sells its product primarily under the core brands Triumph® and sloggi®.

Johann Gottfried Spiesshofer was married to Anna Helene Barth. They had five children.

Notes

References

 
From corsetry to lingerie – a cultural history of corsetry in Germany

External links
 History of Triumph International

1854 births
1917 deaths
Businesspeople from Baden-Württemberg
Corsetry
People from Ostalbkreis